Chahar Kent is a village in Balkh Province in northern Afghanistan.

See also 
 Chahar Kint District
 Balkh Province

References

External links
Satellite map at Maplandia.com

Populated places in Balkh Province
Villages in Afghanistan